Tranquilidade (Tranquility in English) is a Portuguese insurance company, founded in Porto in 1871.  It is a subsidiary of Italian insurance group Generali Italia.

Is one of the largest non-life insurers in the Portuguese market with a comprehensive and specialized insurance offer for individuals and companies.

Through its life insurer, T-Vida, also offers life, retirement and financial solutions. It has close to 400 points of sale, among its own stores and agents and a vast network of mediation throughout the country. Tranquilidade has subsidiaries in several countries, such as Spain, Angola and Mozambique.

History 
Tranquilidade was founded as Companhia de Seguros Tranquilidade Portuense – Companhia de Seguros contra Fogo in 1871. By 1935 it was under control of José Ribeiro Espírito Santo Silva, and would later become part of the Espírito Santo Group. After the 1974 revolution in Portugal, the company was nationalized and merged with other insurance companies, and later reprivatised.

In 2015, in the aftermath of the demise of the Espírito Santo Group, it was sold to the Apollo Global Management fund for 215 million €. In 2016 Tranquildade acquired Açoreana Seguros.

In 2020 Apollo sold Tranquilidade to Italian group Generali for 600 million €. Subsequently, Generalli merged it with its business units in Portugal and Tranquilidade became a brand name of Generali Seguros, S.A.

References

External links
Tranquilidade

Insurance companies of Portugal
Financial services companies established in 1871